Bald Hills railway station is located on the North Coast line in Queensland, Australia. It serves the Brisbane suburb of Bald Hills. On 28 August 2000, a third platform opened as part of the addition of a third track from Northgate.

Services
Bald Hills is served by all City network services from Kippa-Ring to Central, many continuing to Springfield Central.

Services by platform

References

External links

Strathpine station Queensland Rail
Bald Hills station Queensland's Railways on the Internet

Bald Hills, Queensland
Railway stations in Brisbane
North Coast railway line, Queensland